Michel Poffet (born 24 August 1957) is a Swiss fencer. He won a bronze medal in the team épée event at the 1976 Summer Olympics.

References

External links
 

1957 births
Living people
Swiss male épée fencers
Olympic fencers of Switzerland
Fencers at the 1976 Summer Olympics
Fencers at the 1984 Summer Olympics
Fencers at the 1988 Summer Olympics
Olympic bronze medalists for Switzerland
Olympic medalists in fencing
Medalists at the 1976 Summer Olympics
20th-century Swiss people
21st-century Swiss people